CENELEC is responsible for European standardization in the area of electrical engineering. Together with ETSI (telecommunications) and CEN (other technical areas), it forms the European system for technical standardization. Standards harmonised by these agencies are regularly adopted in many countries outside Europe which follow European technical standards. Although CENELEC works closely with the European Union, it is not an EU institution. Nevertheless, its standards are "EN" EU (and EEA) standards, thanks to EU Regulation 1025/2012.

CENELEC was founded in 1973. Before that two organizations were responsible for electrotechnical standardization: CENELCOM and CENEL. CENELEC is a non-profit organization under Belgian law, based in Brussels. The members are the national electrotechnical standardization bodies of most European countries.

Agreement types

Members
The current members of CENELEC are: Austria, Belgium, Bulgaria, Croatia, Cyprus, the Czech Republic, Denmark, Estonia, Finland, France, Germany, Greece, Hungary, Iceland, Ireland, Italy, Latvia, Lithuania, Luxembourg, Malta, the Netherlands, North Macedonia, Norway, Poland, Portugal, Romania, Serbia, Spain, Slovakia, Slovenia, Sweden, Switzerland, Turkey and the United Kingdom.

Affiliates 
Albania, Belarus, Bosnia/Herzegovina, Egypt, Georgia, Israel, Jordan, Libya, Moldova, Montenegro, Morocco, Tunisia and Ukraine are currently "affiliate members" with a view to becoming full members.

Others
CENELEC has cooperation agreements with: Canada, China, Japan, South Korea, Russia and an informal agreement with the USA.

History 
After the Dresden Agreement (1996), CENELEC coordinates standard development activities with IEC. Older IEC standards were converted in 1997 by adding 60000, for example IEC 27 became IEC 60027 and the same standards are also published in the EN 60000 series to indicate adoption by CENELEC as a European standard; for example IEC 60034 is also available as EN 60034. Regional European standards issued by CENELEC, which are not adopted IEC standards, are numbered in the EN 50000 series.

, more than 90% of the standards passed by CENELEC used the Dresden Agreement process. The alternative process in which a member National Committee proposes a standard is called the Vilamoura process (or procedure).

The Dresden Agreement was updated with the Frankfurt Agreement in October 2016, and decisions are detailed in CENELEC Guide 13 (2016). Following the publication of this guide, IEC standards adopted by CENELEC shall be referenced as "EN IEC 6xxxx".

Voting
, a weighted voting system was in place, with member countries having the following number of votes:
 France, Germany, Italy, and UK: 10 votes (each)
 Spain: 8 votes
 Belgium, Greece, Netherlands, Portugal, and Switzerland: 5 votes
 Austria and Sweden: 4 votes
 Denmark, Finland, Ireland and Norway: 3 votes
 Luxembourg: 2 votes
 Iceland: 1 vote

For a proposal to pass, 71% of members need be in favor (according to weighted system above) or 71% of EEA members need be in favor (excluding Switzerland).

 this system was updated as follows:
 France, Germany, Italy, (non-EU) UK, (non-EU) Turkey: 29 votes (each)
 Poland and Spain: 27 votes
 Romania: 14 votes
 Netherlands: 13 votes
 Belgium, Czechia, Greece, Hungary, and Portugal: 12 votes
 Austria, Bulgaria, Sweden, and (non-EU) Switzerland: 10 votes
 Croatia, Denmark, Finland, Ireland, Lithuania, Slovakia, and (non-EU) Norway: 7 votes
 Cyprus, Estonia, Latvia, Luxembourg, Slovenia, and (non-EU) North Macedonia: 4 votes
 Malta and (non-EU) Iceland: 3 votes

The weighted voting standard was maintained at 71%, meaning that if the 17 largest-weight countries vote for a standard it will pass (this also means the top 50% [by weight] countries voting in favor). If a proposal does not pass this way, a second vote taking into account only EU members is taken, with the threshold again being 71%. However, unlike EU member states, non-EU CENELEC member countries are not required to transfer EN standards into national standards (although they usually do so).

See also
 European Committee for Standardization (CEN)
 European Telecommunications Standards Institute (ETSI)
 European Office of Crafts, Trades and Small and Medium-sized Enterprises for Standardisation (NORMAPME)
 European Norms Electrical Certification (ENEC)

References

External links

Electrical safety standards organizations
European Union and science and technology
Science and technology in Europe
Standards organisations in Belgium